Inge Karlsson (born 25 September 1946) is a former Swedish footballer. He made 164 Allsvenskan appearances for Djurgårdens IF.

Honours

Club 

 Djurgårdens IF 
 Allsvenskan: 1966

References

Swedish footballers
Sweden youth international footballers
Allsvenskan players
Djurgårdens IF Fotboll players
1946 births
Living people
Association football defenders